Mussini is an Italian surname. Notable people with the surname include: 

 Augusto Mussini (1870–1918), Italian painter and friar
 Cesare Mussini (1804–1879), German-Italian painter
 Federico Mussini (born 1996), Italian basketball player 
 Luigi Mussini (1813–1888), Italian painter

Italian-language surnames